Vanderaerden is a surname. Notable people with the surname include:

 Eric Vanderaerden (born 1962), Belgian racing cyclist
 Gert Vanderaerden (born 1973), Belgian racing cyclist, brother of Eric
  (born 1987), Belgian racing cyclist

Surnames of Belgian origin